David Cockatoo-Collins (born 1 April 1978) is a former Australian rules footballer who played with Melbourne in the Australian Football League (AFL).

An Indigenous Australian, he is a younger brother of Che Cockatoo-Collins and twin brother of Don Cockatoo-Collins, both from Cairns, Queensland. He made two appearances for Melbourne, over three seasons.

The twins made their league debuts together, in the opening round of the 1996 AFL season, against Geelong at the Melbourne Cricket Ground. His only other appearance came the following year, in round 17, against Collingwood. He played as a small forward.

References

External links
 
 

1978 births
Australian rules footballers from South Australia
Melbourne Football Club players
Port Adelaide Football Club (SANFL) players
Port Adelaide Football Club players (all competitions)
Indigenous Australian players of Australian rules football
Australian twins
Twin sportspeople
Living people